Radostów Drugi  is a village in the administrative district of Gmina Czastary, within Wieruszów County, Łódź Voivodeship, in central Poland.

The village has a population of 280.

References

Villages in Wieruszów County